Charis Elisa Michelsen  (born December 30, 1974) is an American actress, a former model and a make-up artist. Michelsen worked as a model in New York City in her early adulthood before becoming an actress. She appeared in supporting roles in the films High Art (1998), Martin Scorsese's Bringing Out the Dead (1999), and Wonder Boys (2000).

Life and career
Charis (pronounced Chær-us) Michelsen was raised in Boring, Oregon, a small town east of Portland. After high school, she moved to New York City to study art at Parsons School of Design, where a photographer for Harper's Bazaar discovered her for modeling. While attending a rock concert, Michelsen was discovered by Liv Tyler's mother Bebe Buell, who became her career manager.

Michelsen played the role of "Debby" in the 1998, award-winning film High Art, and soon after appeared in Martin Scorsese's film Bringing Out the Dead. Michelsen then went to work on the films Wonder Boys and Orphan. She eventually relocated to Los Angeles.

In 1997, Michelsen was the voice for the co-starring role of "Keri Boyer" in I Married A Strange Person, directed by Bill Plympton.

Film critics have declared Michelsen, "a bewitching young thing" -Michael Atkinson (The Village Voice),"sensuous" -Michael Tunison 
(BoxOffice Magazine); have said that "Charis Michelsen is beautiful, her opaque blue eyes and internal acting make her someone
who critics should continue to watch." -Mike Szymanski (Variety), and have said that she has "a fetching, fainty Natalie Imbruglia-ish screen presence" -Brent Simon (Entertainment Today).

Besides Scorsese, Michelsen has worked with Nicolas Cage, Michael Douglas, Tobey Maguire, Robert Downey Jr., Katie Holmes, Ving Rhames, and others.

Michelsen played Mrs. Wyatt Cooper (Eric Dane's wife) on an episode of the ABC television drama Gideon's Crossing. She also starred with Peter Steele in his band Type O Negative's music video "My Girlfriend's Girlfriend," and with Liv Tyler in the music video "If" by Coyote Shivers.

She was married to actor and director Josh Evans from 2003 to 2011, and is the former daughter-in-law of the late movie producer Robert Evans and actress Ali MacGraw.

Filmography

Film

Music videos

References

External links
 
 Los Angeles Times, Review, Erosion, April 21, 2006
 The New York Times, "Film in Review," The Price of Air, September 29. 2000
 The New Yorker, "The Film File," I Married a Strange Person, September 7, 1998

20th-century American actresses
21st-century American actresses
Actresses from California
People from Boring, Oregon
American film actresses
American make-up artists
American television actresses
Living people
Actresses from Oregon
1974 births
Evans family (Paramount Pictures)